Antonio Moura Sanches, usually known as Toninho Moura (born 22 July 1954 in Bauru) is a Brazilian football head coach.

Bellmare Hiratsuka
In 1996, Moura signed with J1 League club Bellmare Hiratsuka which many international player Hidetoshi Nakata, Akira Narahashi, Nobuyuki Kojima and so on played for. However the club results were bad and he resigned in September when the club was at the 11th place of 16 clubs.

Managerial statistics

Honours
 União Mogi
 Campeonato Paulista Segunda Divisão: 2006

References

External links

Living people
1954 births
Brazilian expatriates in Japan
Brazilian footballers
Expatriate football managers in Japan
Nacional Atlético Clube (SP) managers
Clube Atlético Sorocaba managers
J1 League managers
Shonan Bellmare managers
Associação Atlética Internacional (Limeira) managers
Sociedade Esportiva Matonense managers
Esporte Clube Noroeste managers
Esporte Clube Taubaté managers
Associação Ferroviária de Esportes managers
São José Esporte Clube managers
Tupi Football Club managers
Grêmio Barueri Futebol managers
Arapongas Esporte Clube managers
Association footballers not categorized by position
Brazilian football managers
People from Bauru
Footballers from São Paulo (state)